The second season of Alias premiered September 29, 2002 on ABC and concluded May 4, 2003 and was released on DVD in region 1 on December 2, 2003. Guest stars in season two include David Carradine, Ethan Hawke, Richard Lewis, Faye Dunaway, Rutger Hauer, Christian Slater, and Danny Trejo. The thirteenth episode of the season, Phase One, aired after Super Bowl XXXVII.

Cast
Main characters
 Jennifer Garner as Sydney Bristow (22 episodes)
 Ron Rifkin as Arvin Sloane (22 episodes)
 Michael Vartan as Michael Vaughn (22 episodes)
 Bradley Cooper as Will Tippin (19 episodes)
 Merrin Dungey as Francie Calfo and Allison Doren (21 episodes)
 Carl Lumbly as Marcus Dixon (16 episodes)
 Kevin Weisman as Marshall Flinkman (21 episodes)
 David Anders as Julian Sark (15 episodes)
 Lena Olin as Irina Derevko (17 episodes)
 Victor Garber as Jack Bristow (22 episodes)

Recurring characters

Episodes

Home release
The 6-DVD box set of Season 2 was released in region 1 format (US) on December 2, 2003, in region 2 format (UK) on June 7, 2004 and in region 4 format (AU) on July 4, 2004. The DVDs contain all episodes of Season 2, plus the following features:
 Deleted Scenes
 Gag Reel
 Audio Commentary with cast & crew
 The Making of The Telling – An In-Depth Look at the Season Finale
 The Making of the Video Game
 Featurette: Undercover: The Look of Alias – A Look at Costume Design, Makeup, and Disguises
(A skit filmed for Monday Night Football was advertised as being in the set, but was removed from the DVD set before release.)

References

External links
 Alias Season 2 at Alias-TV.com
 

2002 American television seasons
2003 American television seasons
Alias (TV series) seasons